Izzy Stradlin & the Ju Ju Hounds Live is a live EP recorded in Dublin by American rock musician Izzy Stradlin and his band The Ju Ju Hounds. The record comes from a show that was played at The Tivoli Theatre in Dublin, Ireland, on 18 December 1992. This five-song EP was released in Japan only.

Track listing
Bucket O' Trouble (Stradlin)
Cuttin' the Rug (Stradlin)
Jivin' Sister Fanny (Mick Jagger/Keith Richards)
Time Gone By (Stradlin/Rick Richards)
Highway 49 (Joe Williams)

Personnel
Izzy Stradlin – vocals, guitar
Rick Richards – guitar, backing vocals
Jimmy Ashhurst – bass, backing vocals
Charlie "Chalo" Quintana – drums

Izzy Stradlin albums
1993 EPs
1993 live albums
Geffen Records live albums